Kotauratla is a village in Anakapalli district in the state of Andhra Pradesh in India.

Geography
Kota Uratla is located at 17.35N 82.41E. It has an average elevation of 30 meters (101 feet).  There is a river flowing through this village named Varaha.

References 

Villages in Anakapalli district